Girard station is an elevated rapid transit station which is located in Philadelphia, Pennsylvania, on SEPTA's Market-Frankford Line. It is situated at the corner of Front Street and Girard Avenue in the Fishtown neighborhood.

The station is also served by the Route 15, the historic Girard Avenue trolley line, which runs on tracks in the median of Girard Avenue. 

The trolley station is known as Front & Girard. SEPTA bus routes 5 and 25 also serve the station, as well as the Route 15 bus which temporarily replaced trolleys on the Richmond Street section of that line during I-95 construction.

History
Girard is part of the Frankford Elevated section of the line, which began service on November 5, 1922.

Between 1988 and 2003, SEPTA undertook a $493.3 million reconstruction of the  Frankford Elevated. 

Girard station was completely rebuilt on the site of the original station; the project included new platforms, elevators, windscreens, and overpasses, and the station now meets ADA accessibility requirements. The line had originally been built with track ballast and was replaced with precast sections of slab track, allowing the station (and the entire line) to remain open throughout the project.

Station layout

The station's main entrance is located on the northwest corner of Front Street and Girard Avenue. This staircase leads to a fare control barrier serving the eastbound platform, along with an elevated overpass to the westbound platform. 

The westbound platform has an exit-only staircase descending to the northeast corner of the intersection.

References

External links
 

 Images at NYCSubway.org
 Station entrance from Google Maps Street View

SEPTA Market-Frankford Line stations
Railway stations in Philadelphia
SEPTA Route 15 stations
Railway stations in the United States opened in 1922